Din Tai Fung (Pha̍k-fa-sṳ: Tín-thai-fûng) is a Taiwanese restaurant chain. Outside Taiwan, Din Tai Fung also has branches in Australia, China, Hong Kong, Indonesia, Japan, Macau, Malaysia, Philippines, Singapore, South Korea, Thailand, United Arab Emirates, United Kingdom, and the United States.

History

Founder Yang Bingyi, an immigrant from Shanxi, initially worked ten years at Heng Tai Fung, a cooking oil retailer in Taiwan. He then wanted to branch out on his own to support his family. With his Hakka wife, Lai Penmei, he founded a cooking oil retailer in 1958. They named it Din Tai Fung by combining the names of Yang's previous employer, "Heng Tai Fung", and their new supplier, "DinMei Oils".

Around 1970, tinned cooking oil became prevalent, and business diminished drastically. Heng Tai Fung's owner suggested that to survive, Yang and Lai convert half the shop to making and selling steamed buns (xiaolongbao). The buns grew so popular that the store stopped selling oil altogether and became a full-fledged restaurant in 1972. The original restaurant is on Xinyi Road in Taipei.

They soon opened another restaurant in Taipei 101.

In 1996, the first international location opened in Tokyo, and the first North American store opened in Arcadia, California, in 2000. Their first branch in Indonesia opened at the upmarket shopping mall Plaza Senayan Arcadia in Jakarta, Indonesia, on April 24, 2005 - as of 2022, having as many as 13 branches spread across the Greater Jakarta area with three outlet formats (regular Din Tai Fung, Noodle Bar, and Chef's Table) and halal or non-halal selections available. The first European branch was opened in London in December 2018. Due to the impact of the COVID-19 pandemic on the restaurant industry in the United States, the first North American restaurant closed permanently on June 11, 2020. There are still multiple Din Tai Fung restaurants operating in the United States, located in California, Washington, Oregon, and Nevada.

Reputation

Din Tai Fung is known internationally for its paper-thin wrapped xiaolongbao with 18 folds. In November 2009, the Hong Kong and Macau 2010 edition of the Michelin Guide awarded the restaurant's first Hong Kong branch at Tsim Sha Tsui, Silvercord Branch, a Michelin star. The Michelin Guide recommended the restaurant's second branch in Hong Kong at Causeway Bay, Yee Wo Branch, in December 2010, as well as Hong Kong's Silvercord Branch in 2013.

In January 2019, Din Tai Fung voluntarily closed their Westfield Sydney location after discovering rats, which nearby construction had displaced. The city council also required the restaurant to pass health inspections before re-opening.

See also
 List of Chinese restaurants
 List of restaurants in China
 List of restaurants in London
 List of restaurant chains in Australia
 List of companies of Taiwan
 Bafang Dumpling

References

External links

Din Tai Fung official website (Global) 

1958 establishments in Taiwan
Taiwanese restaurants
Chinese restaurants
Culture in Taipei
Fast-food chains of Singapore
Restaurants established in 1958
Restaurant chains
Restaurant chains in Australia
Restaurant chains in Singapore
Restaurant chains in China
Restaurants in Indonesia
Restaurants in Japan
Restaurants in Los Angeles
Restaurants in Orange County, California
Restaurants in New South Wales
Restaurant chains in Taiwan
Asian restaurants in Washington (state)
Taiwanese brands